The Morgenster (Morning Star in Dutch) is a sail training ship based in the Netherlands. She was built, as a herring lugger under the name De Vrouw Maria, in 1919. She was renamed Morgenster in 1959 and continued to be used as a fishing vessel until 1970. After a period of use for sport fishing and in the pirate radio business, she was acquired by her current owners for conversion back to a sailing vessel in 1983. She made her maiden voyage as a sail training ship in 2008, having been refitted as a brig.

Gallery

References

External links
 
 The Morgenster's web site

Brigs
Sailing ships of the Netherlands
Training ships
1919 ships